Čížkrajice is a municipality and village in České Budějovice District in the South Bohemian Region of the Czech Republic. It has about 300 inhabitants.

Administrative parts
Villages of Boršíkov, Chvalkov and Mezilesí are administrative parts of Čížkrajice.

References

Villages in České Budějovice District